"¿Dónde Está Santa Claus?" (Spanish for Where is Santa Claus?) is a novelty Christmas song. 12-year-old Augie Rios had a hit with the song in 1958 which featured the Mark Jeffrey Orchestra. Written by George Scheck, Rod Parker, and Al Greiner, and copyrighted in 1958, the copyright was renewed and is owned by Ragtime Music. The song was originally released on MGM Records' Metro label. The 45 record single was backed with the song "Ol' Fatso (I Don't Care Who You Are Old Fatso, Get Those Reindeer Off My Roof)."

Other versions
It was also covered by actress Charo in 1978 as well as a Spanish-language version by Mexican TV host Chabelo, El Vez from the album Merry Mex-mas and by the rock band Guster in 2003 (on the Maybe This Christmas Too? holiday compilation album).

The a cappella men's singing group Straight No Chaser covers the song on their Christmas Cheers CD (Atlantic Records, 2009).

The song is referred to in Cheech and Chong's holiday hit "Santa Claus and His Old Lady". The song appears in the 2011 movie A Very Harold & Kumar 3D Christmas and is heard in the 2007 movie Where God Left His Shoes. The song also appears during a Christmas scene in the episode "Los Pepes" in season 2 of the TV series Narcos.
It also features in the 2017 Netflix film El Camino Christmas.

A Latin ska version of the song in English and Spanish was recorded and released by California band Mento Buru for their holiday ep "East Bakersfield Christmas" in 2020.

Kumbia All Starz version 

A version of the song by A.B. Quintanilla y Los Kumbia All Starz appears on the fan edition of the album Ayer Fue Kumbia Kings, Hoy Es Kumbia All Starz: Fan Edition, released on October 2, 2007. The song was retitled from ¿Dónde Está Santa Claus?   to ¿Mamacita, Dónde Está Santa Claus?

References 

Songs about Santa Claus
Spanish-language songs
Guster songs
Charo songs
Kumbia All Starz songs
American Christmas songs
Christmas novelty songs
Macaronic songs
1958 songs
EMI Records singles
Song recordings produced by A. B. Quintanilla
2004 singles
Nettwerk Records singles